Hums may refer to:

 Health and usage monitoring systems (HUMS), a technique to ensure availability, reliability and safety of vehicles
 Thomas Hums (born 1989), a Canadian male track cyclist

See also
 Hum (disambiguation)
 Homs